Theobald Rehbaum (17 August 1835 – 2 March 1918) was a German violinist, librettist and composer, especially of operas. 

Born in Berlin, Rehbaum grew up there and sang as a boy in the Royal . He studied violin and composition with Friedrich Kiel, and composition also with Hubertus Rios. Rehbaum composed several operas and choral works, but was more successful as a librettist, writing librettos for Bernhard Scholz. He also wrote a Bratschenschule zum Selbstunterricht für Violinisten (viola method for self-instruction for violinists) and an autobiography titled Erlebtes und Erstrebtes. He died in Berlin.

Works

Operas 
 Don Pablo (Dresden, 1880)
 Das steinerne Herz (Magdeburg, 1885)
 Turandot (Berlin, 1888)
 Oberst Lumpus (Wiesbaden, 1892)
 Die Eingeschriebenen
 Der Goldschmied von París

Orchestral 
 Der Muse Sendung for soprano and orchestra

Literature 
 Enciclopèdia Espasa volum núm. 50, pàg. 318

External 
 
 
 

German composers
German classical violinists
Male classical violinists
1835 births
1918 deaths